Sphacophilus is a genus of sawflies in the family Argidae. There are more than 30 described species in Sphacophilus.

Species
These 32 species belong to the genus Sphacophilus:

 Sphacophilus albicosta Smith
 Sphacophilus apiculus Smith
 Sphacophilus apios Ross, 1933
 Sphacophilus argutus Smith
 Sphacophilus barius Smith
 Sphacophilus cellularis (Say)
 Sphacophilus ceraus Smith
 Sphacophilus crenus Smith
 Sphacophilus darus Smith
 Sphacophilus dissensus Smith
 Sphacophilus edus Smith
 Sphacophilus hamus Smith
 Sphacophilus holmus Smith
 Sphacophilus iotus Smith
 Sphacophilus janzeni Smith
 Sphacophilus jucunus Smith
 Sphacophilus madunus Smith
 Sphacophilus memmonius Smith
 Sphacophilus monjarasi Smith & Morales-Reyes, 2015
 Sphacophilus nigriceps
 Sphacophilus nuntius Smith
 Sphacophilus oblatus Smith
 Sphacophilus odontus Smith
 Sphacophilus orthius Smith
 Sphacophilus orus Smith
 Sphacophilus panitus Smith
 Sphacophilus partitus Smith
 Sphacophilus precarius Smith
 Sphacophilus quixus Smith
 Sphacophilus rallus Smith
 Sphacophilus tenuous Smith
 Sphacophilus triangularis Smith

References

Further reading

External links

Argidae
Articles created by Qbugbot
Hymenoptera genera